Deny is the second album released by the Ex Pistols in 1992. Due to the cover art, the band is often miscredited as the "Sexless Pistols".

The album itself isn't an official, chart worthy album, but a promo pressing of approximately 600 copies. It was given to fans of the Sex Pistols, and occasionally left in Virgin Record stores with a sticker on the front of the sleeve stating that it was actually free. There has never been much information given as to when and why the album was distributed, and as it was never available to purchase it is obviously not readily available. The record itself has become somewhat of a collector's item and copies are occasionally sold on eBay at varying prices.

The album is made up of completely original Ex Pistols songs, and most tracks that had been previously included on other releases are re-recorded on this album. Most copies came complete with a two-sided printed sheet that was also produced by Dave Goodman: a mish-mash of lyrics in a typical Jamie Reid style, and a background made up of various phrases that play on the 'fake Pistols' theme of the band (for example: "Never Trust a Yuppie", "Hash From Chaos" and "Never Mind The Ollocks Here's The Ex Pistols", as opposed to "Never Trust a Hippy, "Cash From Chaos" and "Never Mind The Bollocks Here's The Sex Pistols").

A number of the songs from this album are used for the soundtrack of the DVD Chaos! - Ex Pistols Secret History, which details Dave Goodman and his involvement with the Sex Pistols.

Track listing

Further notes
 The untitled track on side A (number 7) is a mashup of Dave Goodman speaking, and the first single "Land of Hope and Glory".

Albums produced by Dave Goodman (record producer)
1992 albums